Raisa Kurvyakova (born 15 September 1945 in Gorno-Ulbinka, Kazakhstan) is a Ukrainian former basketball player who competed in the 1976 Summer Olympics.

References

1945 births
Living people
People from Akmola Region
Ukrainian women's basketball players
Olympic basketball players of the Soviet Union
Basketball players at the 1976 Summer Olympics
Olympic gold medalists for the Soviet Union
Olympic medalists in basketball
Soviet women's basketball players
Medalists at the 1976 Summer Olympics
Honoured Masters of Sport of the USSR